= Ad Mela =

- Location within Pakistan
- Coordinates: 33.97°N 70.21°E
- Country: Pakistan
- Territory: Federally Administered Tribal Areas
- Elevation: 3,475 m (11,401 ft)
- Time zone: UTC+5 (PST)
  - Summer (DST): UTC+6 (PDT)

Ad Mela is a town in the Federally Administered Tribal Areas of Pakistan. It is located at 33°58'15N 70°12'29E with an altitude of 3475 metres (11404 feet).
